is a town located in Kamikawa Subprefecture, Hokkaido, Japan.

As of September 2016, the town has an estimated population of 3,553 and a population density of 15.8 persons per km2. The total area is 224.83 km2.

The town flower is the Katakuri. Wassamu is famous for its pumpkin and cabbage crops.

Geography

Climate

Education
Wassamu has 3 schools, a middle school, an elementary school and a kindergarten. It previously had a high school, however, was closed due to lack of numbers.

Transportation
It is linked with the Dōō Expressway at Interchange 12 which was first opened on October 4, 2000, and extended to Kembuchi-Shibetsu on October 4, 2003. Wassamu is also linked by train and Route 40 and prefectural roads 48 and 99.

Notable people from Wassamu
Osamu Watanabe, former freestyle wrestler and Olympic gold medalist
TATSUAKI, beatboxer

References

External links

Official Website 

Towns in Hokkaido